Ali Bouraï (Arabic: علي بوراي; born on 5 May 1977) is an Algerian former trampoline gymnast. He had competed at the 2000 Summer Olympics in Sydney.

References

External links
 

1977 births
Living people
Algerian male trampolinists
Olympic gymnasts of Algeria
Gymnasts at the 2000 Summer Olympics
Sportspeople from Algiers
21st-century Algerian people